Michelle Pfeiffer is an American actress. She has received three Academy Award nominations: Best Supporting Actress for Dangerous Liaisons (1988), and Best Actress for The Fabulous Baker Boys (1989) and Love Field (1992).

Film

Television

Soundtrack discography
Grease 2: Original Soundtrack Recording from Grease 2 (1982) as Stephanie Zinone
Hairspray: Soundtrack to the Motion Picture from Hairspray (2007) as Velma Von Tussle

Accolades and accomplishments

Pfeiffer has received several accolades, including a combined three Academy Award nominations:
61st Academy Awards (1988): Best Supporting Actress for Dangerous Liaisons
62nd Academy Awards (1989): Best Actress for The Fabulous Baker Boys
65th Academy Awards (1992): Best Actress for Love Field

These achievements maker Pfeiffer one of few to have achieved nominations for multiple Oscars. Additionally, she has been nominated for a total of eight Golden Globe Awards, in addition to two Screen Actors Guild Awards and a Primetime Emmy Award.

Notes

References

Actress filmographies
American filmographies